Surju was a municipality located in Pärnu County, one of the 15 counties of Estonia.

Settlements
Villages
Ilvese - Jaamaküla - Kalda - Kikepera - Kõveri - Lähkma - Metsaääre -  Rabaküla - Ristiküla - Saunametsa - Surju

References

Former municipalities of Estonia